Paramount International Networks (PIN) is the international division of Paramount Global. The division oversees the production, broadcasting and promotion of key Paramount brands outside of the United States. These brands include Paramount Network, Comedy Central, MTV, Nickelodeon, BET and Colors TV, as well as CBS-branded channels, which are co-owned with AMC Networks International. PIN also owns a 30% stake in the Rainbow S.p.A. animation studio in Italy until 2023, as well as a 49% stake in an Indian joint venture with domestic partner TV18, Viacom18.

The networks' headquarters are located in New York City and London. Other international offices are located in São Paulo, Berlin, Stockholm, Amsterdam, Warsaw, Madrid, Milan, Mumbai, Paris, Singapore, Budapest, Belgrade, and Sydney amongst others. Its first international offices opened in the late 1980s in London and Amsterdam with the launch of MTV Europe. It was created from a rebrand of Viacom's MTV Networks, which included MTV, BET, VH1 and Nickelodeon, to include Comedy Central.

Before being promoted to CEO of Viacom, Robert Bakish was President of VIMN from 2011 to 2016, having held various roles at Viacom since 1997. The division is currently led by Pam Kaufman.

Divisions 
As of January 2020, Paramount International Networks is split into two brand groups (Entertainment and Youth Brands, Kids and Family), and three regional hubs (UK & Australia, EMEAA, and Americas).

United Kingdom and Australia 

Paramount Networks UK & Australia is a subsidiary of Paramount Global, headquartered in London.

Europe, Middle East, Africa, and Asia 

Paramount Networks EMEAA (formerly MTV Networks Europe, Viacom International Media Networks Europe and ViacomCBS Networks EMEAA) is a subsidiary of Paramount Global which serves Europe, the Middle East, Africa, and Asia.

It currently consists of the following branches:

 Paramount Networks Northern Europe, which serves Benelux (the Netherlands, Belgium), Nordic countries (Denmark, Finland, Norway, Sweden), Ireland, DAPOL (Germany, Austria, Poland), German-speaking Switzerland, Estonia, Latvia, Lithuania, Hungary, Republic of Macedonia, Romania, Ukraine, and CIS countries.
 Paramount Networks Southern Europe, Middle East, and Africa (SWEMEA), which serves France, French-speaking Switzerland, Italy, Spain, Portugal, the Middle East, and Africa.
 Paramount Networks Italia, a division that was founded in 2011 in order for Viacom to purchase a 30% ownership stake in the Rainbow S.p.A. animation studio.

India 
Viacom18 is a joint venture between Paramount Global and TV18, which operates the former's television brands in India along with homegrown brand Colors.

The Americas 
Paramount Networks Americas (formerly MTV Networks Latin America, Viacom International Media Networks The Americas and ViacomCBS Networks Americas) is a regional subsidiary of Paramount International Networks. Its operational headquarters is located in Miami, Florida, the US soon to be relocated to Mexico, Brazil, Argentina, and Colombia. As currently being based in the United States, all PNA channels are regulated by the Federal Communications Commission, the U.S. broadcast regulator, despite not yet transmitting for the United States.

Production company 
In 2016, Viacom launched its own subsidiary Viacom International Studios, which have its headquarters in Miami. Its first production was I Am Frankie for Nickelodeon. Following the Viacom-CBS merger, it was rebranded to ViacomCBS International Studios. On June 24, 2020, both ViacomCBS International Studios and sister sibling Miramax is planning on to co-produce The Turkish Detective, the series adaptation of the novels. On September 2, 2020, it returned to production with Mexico's backdoor structure On October 7, 2020, it is revealed that it would streamline its international sales structure. On November 30, 2021, the studio launched a first-look deal program with five British writers to amplify diverse voices.

Channel 5 (United Kingdom) 
On 1 May 2014, Viacom acquired Channel 5 Broadcasting Ltd, and its current channels are:
 Channel 5
 5Select
 5Star
 5USA
 5Action

BET

Current channels

Former Channels

Colors TV 
 Colors (HD)
 Colors Bangla (HD)
 Colors Gujarati
 Colors Kannada (HD)
 Colors Marathi (HD)
 Colors Rishtey
 Colors Tamil (HD)
 Colors Odia
 Colors Infinity (HD)
 Colors Super
 Colors Maha One (HD)

Comedy Central

Current channels

Former Channels

MTV

Current channels

Former channels

Network 10 (Australia) 
One of Australia's three commercial free-to-air channels. Ten Network Holdings was bought by CBS Corporation on 16 November 2017, becoming part of ViacomCBS Networks International following the 2019 Viacom merger.

Channels:
 Network 10
 10 Peach
 10 Bold
 10 Shake
 10 HD

Internet:
 10 Play
 10 Daily
 Paramount+ (formerly 10 All Access)

Nickelodeon

Current channels

Former channels

Nick Jr.

Current channels

Former channels

Nicktoons

Current channels

Former channels

TeenNick

Current channels

Former channels 

Greece

TeenNick Greece

NickMusic

Paramount Network

Current channels

Former channels

VH1

Current channels

Former channels

Other networks

Chilevisión
 Chilevisión is a Chilean free-to-air television channel launched on 4 November 1960.

Game One
 Game One is a French television channel that launched in September 1998. It shows programs based on video gaming, pop culture and Japanese anime.

J-One
 J-One is a French television channel launched on 4 October 2013. It is dedicated to Asian anime and culture.

Super!
 Super! is an Italian free channel that airs children's programming, which is mostly taken from Nickelodeon.

Telefe 
 Telefe is an Argentinian television station launched on January 15, 1990.
 Telefe Internacional  is the international signal of Telefe.

CBS International (co-owned with AMC Networks International) 
 RealityXtra
 CBS Europa
 CBS Reality
 LEGEND

Former networks

VIVA 
VIVA Media GmbH (until 2004 VIVA Media AG) was a music television network originating from Germany. It was founded as an alternative to MTV by Time Warner executives Tom McGrath and Peter Bogner with Rudi Dolezal and Hannes Rossacher from DoRo Productions, which created music videos. The channel was a broadcast of VIVA Germany as VIVA Media AG in 1993 and has been owned by their former competitor Viacom, the parent company of MTV, since 2004. Viva channels exist in some European countries; the first spin-offs were launched in Poland and Switzerland in 2000.

Austria
VIVA Austria was launched in May 2012, 15% of the channel's programming consists of Austrian music, music tops, and lifestyle programming focused on the Austrian market. The channels marketing and promotion are managed by Goldback Media. Before 2012, VIVA Germany aired across Austria with localized advertising and sponsorship for Austria.

Germany
VIVA Germany

German-speaking Switzerland
VIVA Switzerland

Poland
VIVA Poland was a Polish music channel launched on 10 June 2000 by the German VIVA Media AG. On 17 July 2012, the channel stopped being an FTA network and was pulled off from Eutelsat Hot Bird 13A satellite. In 2014, the station canceled local production shows. In 2015 - 2017, the station canceled all reality TV shows and continued playing only electronic dance music. Before the new broadcast schedule, the station was playing Polish and international pop, dance, rock, and hip hop music.

Hungary
VIVA Hungary was a music channel launched on 27 June 1997 as Z+. Like its sister channels, the channel features localized music videos, programming, presenters, and chart shows. The channel started to use the new logo on 2 April 2012. The channel ended broadcast on 3 October 2017 replaced by MTV Music.

Netherlands
The Box was originally a Dutch music channel, which allowed viewers to vote on music videos. It was owned by VIVA Media. It launched in 1995 and was replaced by Comedy Central in 2007.

United Kingdom & Ireland
VIVA UK & Ireland was launched on 26 October 2009, replacing TMF, and ceased broadcasting on 31 January 2018.

TMF 
 The Music Factory
 TMF Flanders
 TMF Netherlands

CBS International (co-owned with AMC Networks International) 
 CBS Action
 CBS Justice

Notes

References 

 
Companies based in New York City
Companies based in the London Borough of Camden
1987 establishments in New York (state)
Mass media companies established in 1987
International
Networks International